Kvänum is a locality situated in Vara Municipality, Västra Götaland County, Sweden with 1,277 inhabitants in 2010.

The town was a subject of the 2007 documentary film Aching Heart.

References 

Populated places in Västra Götaland County
Populated places in Vara Municipality